Sultan Ahmed or Sultan Ahmet may refer to:

 Ahmed I of the Ottoman Empire
 Ahmed II of the Ottoman Empire
 Ahmed III of the Ottoman Empire
 Sultanahmet Meydanı (or Square), the Turkish name for the Hippodrome of Constantinople
 Sultan Ahmed Mosque, Istanbul

Other people
 Sultan Ahmed (Omani cricketer) (born 1977)
 Sultan Ahmed (Emirati cricketer) (born 1989)
 Sultan Ahmed (director) (1938–2002), Indian film director
 Sultan Ahmed (Guantanamo detainee 842), Pakistani captive released June 28, 2005
 Sultan Ahmed (Indian politician) (1953–2017), Union Minister of State for Tourism in India
 Syed Sultan Ahmed (1880–1963), Indian barrister and politician
 Sultan Ahmed (Burmese politician), Burmese politician